Ralph Keen (born 1957) is an American historian of religion and an academic administrator at the University of Illinois at Chicago. Trained in classics as an undergraduate with graduate work in the history of Christianity, Keen has since 2010 been professor of history at the University of Illinois at Chicago, and since 2015 he has been dean of the Honors College there.

His research in Reformation-era religious thought includes Divine and Human Authority in Reformation Thought (1997), Luther’s Lives (2003), The Christian Tradition (2008), Exile and Restoration in Jewish Thought (2011), as well as editions of works by Thomas More and Johannes Cochlaeus. Keen is also a co-editor of the monograph series Catholic Christendom, 1300–1700 published by Brill.

In 2018, he was president of the American Society of Church History.

Keen received a bachelor's degree in Greek from Columbia University, master's degree in classics from Yale University, and a Ph.D. in the history of Christianity from the University of Chicago.

References

External links 
 

1957 births
20th-century American historians
20th-century American male writers
21st-century American historians
21st-century American male writers
Alaska Pacific University faculty
American historians of religion
American university and college faculty deans
Columbia College (New York) alumni
Historians from Illinois
Historians of the Catholic Church
Living people
Presidents of the American Society of Church History
Reformation historians
University of Chicago alumni
University of Illinois Chicago faculty
University of Iowa faculty
Yale University alumni
American male non-fiction writers